"The Prayer of Russians" is a song that was used as the national anthem of Imperial Russia from 1816 to 1833.

After defeating the First French Empire, Tsar Alexander I of Russia recommended a national anthem for Russia. The lyrics were written by Vasily Zhukovsky, and the music of the British anthem "God Save the King" was used.

In 1833, "The Prayer of Russians" was replaced with "God Save the Tsar" (Bozhe, tsarya khrani). The two songs both start with the same words Bozhe, tsarya khrani but diverge after that.

Some consider God Save the Tsar Russia's first true national anthem, as both its words and music were Russian. Others say the title belongs to Grom pobedy, razdavaysya!, another popular song of the time, although it never had official status.

Lyrics

External links
Prayer of Russians (in Russian)
An audio recording of Molitva russkikh by Valaam choir

European anthems
Christian prayer
Historical national anthems
Russian anthems
Royal anthems
1816 songs
National anthem compositions in G major
God Save the King